South Punjab may refer to:

the southern part of the region of Punjab in South Asia
South Punjab (region), an historic region in the 8th–9th centuries; see Timeline of Pakistani history
two proposed provinces in this region in Pakistan:
Saraikistan or South Punjab Province 
Bahawalpur South Punjab
Malwa (Punjab), the southern region of Indian Punjab

See also
Southern Punjab cricket team (disambiguation)